Love Life of a Gentle Coward is a 2009 Croatian comedy film directed by Pavo Marinković. It won three awards at the 2009 Pula Film Festival.

Plot 
Saša Mihelčić is a journalist and a failed writer in his early thirties. He scrapes a living by writing a newspaper column on gastronomy, inherited from his father, a journalism legend. His listless existence is changed when he meets Ines, a former volleyball player who works as a masseuse in his gym. They begin a romantic relationship, and - wanting to show himself as a man of character for once - he writes a scathing review of a restaurant owned by Braco, a politically influential investor. This lands Saša in serious trouble, forcing him to face and overcome the weaker points of his character...

Cast 
 Nenad Cvetko - Saša
 Dijana Vidušin - Ines
 Siniša Popović - Mladen
 Jan Budař - Honza
 Filip Šovagović - Filip
 Zoran Čubrilo - Braco

References

External links 

'Ljubavni život domobrana' i 'Metastaze' za kraj Pule
Ništa novo u Puli

2009 comedy films
Croatian comedy films
2009 directorial debut films
2009 films
Films set in Zagreb